The đàn hồ (Chữ Nôm: 彈胡) is a two-stringed vertical violin with wooden resonator. The term hồ ("barbarian, central Asian" 胡) derives from Chinese hu, as in Chinese huqin 胡琴). It is similar to the yehu.

References

Vietnamese musical instruments